Baius may refer to:

 Michael Baius, Belgian theologian
 Bajus, Pas-de-Calais, France